Local elections to Greater Manchester County Council, a Metropolitan County Council encompassing Greater Manchester, were held on 12 April 1973. This was the first election held for the authority, having been established by operation of the Local Government Act 1972. Following the election the Labour Party assumed control of the Council.

Results

Overall Results

References

1973 English local elections
1973